Nitrome Games Limited is a British independent video game developer based in London. The company formerly developed Unity-based games (and previously Flash-based) for Web browsers, but now publishes and develops games across multiple platforms including mobile, Nintendo Switch, and PS4, with a few releases on Steam. 

Their games are recognizable by the pixel art design and cartoon-like appearance, along with a jingle to the start of every game and the use of chiptune.

Nitrome was started on 10 August 2004 by Matthew Annal and Heather Stancliffe, two graphic designers, intending to create games for mobile phones. Instead, the company began taking on commissions for Internet-based flash games. Some of Nitrome's games feature characters which are inspired by other characters from video games, TV shows, and various other sources. Nitrome's online games are published on their website, and were available to license on other websites such as Miniclip, MTV Arcade and PCH Games.

History 
Nitrome's creation stemmed from a conversation between Matthew Annal and Heather Stancliffe, in which Annal suggested that they make a game for mobile phones. Stancliffe was initially hesitant, but was persuaded that it could be a successful idea. The temporary website for their upcoming project was first launched on 3 April 2005, with a preview video of Chick Flick, their intended first game. Since then, Nitrome has made 146 flash games, their 135th game being Turn-Undead, released on 7 October 2014, and are venturing into mobile phone and PC gaming, as their current flash games aren't providing enough revenue. In September 2011, Annal was joined by his brother, Jonathan Roy Annal. On 24 November 2011 Nitrome released their 100th game, Nitrome Must Die, in which players shoot enemies from the previous 99 games that Nitrome has made before Nitrome Must Die. Their 136th game is Endless Doves. In 2015, Nitrome made history by releasing their 140th game, Fluffball, their unreleased game from 2007, and their 141st game, Silly Sausage in Meat Land, sequel to their 2011 game, Silly Sausage. Also in 2015, their 142nd game Cooped Up, was released, followed by Green Ninja, Vault, Beneath the Lighthouse, and ultimately, their first published game, Ultimate Briefcase, in 2016. In 2017, a teaser for the game Bomb Chicken was released. In 2018, it was revealed that same game would arrive on the Nintendo Switch, ultimately being a big milestone for Nitrome.

In May of 2020, the company announced a partnership with Poki B.V, an Amsterdam-based online game publisher, in order to port their Flash-based games to HTML5.

Games 
The games made by the company are divided into four main categories. "Hearted" are the games that have received the most hearts from the heart button upon every game, and are thus considered the most popular. "All Games" is a list of all games produced by Nitrome, while "Multiplayer games" are designed for more than one person to play at once. Last, "Touchy", released in 2012, featured games that are playable on Nitrome's mobile phone app, Nitrome Touchy. Games can be in more than one category. On 8 July 2015 Nitrome announced that Nitrome Touchy was officially discontinued. All links and services related to Touchy were taken down. Turn-Undead was the final Touchy game, released October 2014.

Nitrome has made games for MTV Arcade, PCH Games and Miniclip.

Most of the games are divided into levels (usually between 10 and 100), and also give the player the option to replay any level they have completed, even if they have lost. Some games also feature the concept of bosses.

In July 2009, Nitrome Limited released Twin Shot 2, their first game to use MochiCoins, a system allowing players to pay for extra content in browser games. Matthew Annal said that Nitrome were "trialling" and that they "don't intend to use it in every game". They used MochiCoins again in B.C. Bow Contest, which they have updated twice. MochiCoins, however, were discontinued by Mochi Media, preventing Nitrome from using them in any more of their games. As a result, Twin Shot 2 and B.C. Bow Contest were updated so their extra content would instead be paid with (free to obtain) in-game currency.

Since 2014, Nitrome's game development has focused on producing mobile games.

Web games

Mobile games

Demo games

Cancelled games

Console games

References

External links
 Pocket Gamer Profile
 
 Reddit Profile
 Twitter Profile
 Discord Profile

Video game development companies
Browser-based game websites
Video game companies of the United Kingdom
Video game companies established in 2004
Companies based in the London Borough of Islington
2004 establishments in England
Internet properties established in 2004